Petrea is a genus of evergreen flowering vines native to tropical Americas.

The genus was named in honour of Robert James Petre, an English patron of botany.

Species
The following species are currently recognized:

Petrea blanchetiana Schauer 
Petrea bracteata Steud.
Petrea brevicalyx Ducke
Petrea campinae Rueda
Petrea insignis Schauer
Petrea macrostachya Benth.
Petrea maynensis Huber
Petrea pubescens Turcz.
Petrea rugosa Kunth
Petrea sulphurea Jans.-Jac.
Petrea volubilis L.

References

Verbenaceae
Verbenaceae genera